The Arkansas Department of Human Services (DHS) is a state agency of Arkansas, headquartered in Donaghey Plaza South of the Donaghey Complex, a five-story building on the southwest corner of Main Street and 7th Street, in Little Rock. 

The DHS is a cabinet level agency in the executive branch of government responsible maintaining social services for Arkansas by providing assistance to families and monitoring/inspecting health facilities.

Boards and Commissions
In Arkansas's shared services model of state government, the cabinet-level agencies assist boards and commissions who have an overlapping scope. ADH supports:

Boards
State Institutional System Board 
Early Head Start Governance Board 
Child Welfare Agency Review Board (Placement and Residential Licensing)
Act 1434 Board (“Name Removal Board” or “Child Maltreatment Central Registry Review Team”) 
Board of Developmental Disabilities Services
Drug Utilization Review Board 
Retrospective Drug Utilization Review Board
Arkansas Coalition for Juvenile Justice Board
Youth Justice Reform Board 

Commissions
Arkansas Early Childhood Commission
Commission on Children, Youth, and Families

Community Action Agencies
Arkansas River Valley Area Council
Black River Area Development Corp
Central Arkansas Development Council
Community Action Program for Central Arkansas
Crowley's Ridge Development Council
Crawford-Sebastian Community Development Council
Community Services Office
Economic Opportunity Agency of Washington County
Mississippi County, AR Economic Opportunity Agency
Mid-Delta Community Services
Northcentral Arkansas Development Council
Office of Human Concern
Ozark Opportunities
Pine Bluff Jefferson County Economic Opportunity Agency - Central Delta Community Action Agency
Southeast Arkansas Community Action Corp

Councils
Arkansas Alcohol and Drug Abuse Coordinating Council
Arkansas Behavioral Health Planning and Advisory Council
Arkansas Governor's Council on Developmental Disabilities
Arkansas State Hospital Advisory Council
Governor's Advisory Council on Aging
Interagency Council (ICC) for First Connections/State Interagency Council
Parent Advisory Council

Committees
Child Death and Near Fatality Multidisciplinary Review Committee 
Human Development Center Mortality Review Committee
Drug Cost Committee
Drug Review Committee
Patient-Centered Medical Home Committee
Rate Appeal and Cost Settlement Committee 
Security Advisory Committee

Other
Arkansas Community Action Agencies Association
Arkansas Lifespan Respite Coalition
Arkansas State Epidemiological Outcomes Workgroup
Autism Legislative Task Force 
Child Care Appeal Review Panel 
Citizens Review Panel 
Governor's Employment First Task Force
Strategic Advisory Group

Division Of Aging, Adult, & Behavioral Health Services
The Division Of Aging, Adult, & Behavioral Health Services (DAABHS) serves Arkansans needing behavioral health services (mental health and substance abuse) and those aging in place or with physical disabilities needing services to remain in their homes.

DAABHS is subdivided into five sections:
Drug Prevention and Treatment
Aging and Adult Services
Behavioral Health Services
Forensics 
Beneficiary Support

Division Of Child Care & Early Childhood Education

Division Of Children & Family Services

Division Of County Operations

Division Of Developmental Disabilities Services

Division Of Medical Services
The Division of Medical Services manages Arkansas's Medicaid program, ARKids First, and Arkansas Works.

Division of Provider Services & Quality Assurance
The Division of Provider Services & Quality Assurance (DPSQA) oversees inspection, certification, and licensing of care facilities including nursing homes, mental health clinics, developmentally disabled offices and home health-care companies.

DPSQA is subdivided into three units:
Office of Long-term Care
Office of Community Services
Performance & Engagement

Division of Youth Services
The Division of Youth Services (DYS) provides services to families and children.

DYS operates correctional facilities for juveniles. The Arkansas Juvenile Assessment & Treatment Center (AJATC), located in Bryant in Saline County, near Alexander, is the primary intake and assessment center for juveniles. Originally established as the Girls Industrial School by Act 199 in 1905, the center houses boys and girls. In the late 1970s the center began to house boys, and the center received a fence in 1998. In 2007 Act 855 renamed the facility to its current name. The Dermott Juvenile Correctional Facility, located in Dermott in Chicot County, houses up to 32 men of the ages 18–21. There is also the Colt Juvenile Treatment Center in St. Francis County, Harrisburg Juvenile Treatment Center in Poinsett County, and the Mansfield Juvenile Treatment Center and Mansfield Juvenile Treatment Center for Girls on a  property near the Poteau Mountains.

Previous facilities of the State of Arkansas that housed juveniles include the Negro Boys Industrial School in Wrightsville, the Arkansas Boys Industrial School near Pine Bluff, and state industrial schools for white girls and black girls. On January 9, 1957 Orvel M. Johnson, the state legislative auditor, recommended consolidating the white and black girls' schools together and locating the new institution, which would still be racially segregated, on the site of the then-current boys school.

See also

 Howard v. Arkansas
 Arkansas Department of Human Services v. Ahlborn
 Arkansas Department of Human Services v. Cole
 Arkansas Department of Correction (operates adult correctional facilities)

References

External links
 Arkansas Department of Human Services

Child abuse in the United States
Child welfare in the United States
Elderly care
Medicare and Medicaid (United States)
Human Services, Arkansas Department of
State corrections departments of the United States
Juvenile detention centers in the United States
United States elder law